"Sail On, Sailor" (mislabeled "Sail On Sailor" on original pressings) is a song by American rock band the Beach Boys from their 1973 album Holland. It was written primarily by Van Dyke Parks and Brian Wilson with Ray Kennedy, Tandyn Almer, and Jack Rieley. The lead singer on the song is Blondie Chaplin, making this one of the band's few well-known songs not sung by Mike Love, Brian Wilson, or Carl Wilson. The song was released as a single in 1973, backed with "Only with You", and peaked at number 79 on the American singles charts. A 1975 reissue (also backed with "Only with You") charted higher, at number 49.

Wilson himself later stated, "It's the only song that we did that I absolutely do not like at all. I never liked 'Sail On, Sailor'." Nonetheless, according to biographer Jon Stebbins, the song "is perhaps the only perennial Beach Boys favorite to still thrive in the classic rock and album rock FM radio formats of the present."

Background

Initial writing and demo tape
Van Dyke Parks, who was then director of audio-visual services at Warner Bros. Records, explained the impetus for the song: "I called [Brian] up out of the clear blue sky and at some point he said, 'Let's write a tune.' It was better than having him stare at the angels on his headboard and write tunes about them." On another occasion, he shared further context, 

Parks credited himself as the primary composer of "Sail On, Sailor", saying, "I went over to Brian's with my new [tape recorder] and told him the name of the tune and sang those intervals, and he pumped out the rest of that song." In 2002, Wilson said of the song: "Van Dyke really inspired this one. We worked on it originally; then, the other collaborators contributed some different lyrics. By the time the Beach Boys recorded it, the lyrics were all over the place. But I love how this song rocks."

There exists a fifteen-minute cassette recording of Parks and Wilson writing the song on Wilson's piano. According to Parks, "it's clear from the contents [of the tape] that I authored the words and the musical intervals to 'Sail on Sailor.' It's also clear that I composed the bridge, played them, and taught them to Brian." Biographer Timothy White quoted an anonymous source's description of the tape's contents, "Brian was playing that song on the piano. It was completely different words. He's singing different words; much better words." One of the discarded lyrical passages in the song was "Fill your sails with fortitude / and ride her stormy waves / You've got to sail on, sail on, sailor". 

The tape, according to one report, begins with the following exchange:

Another report of the tape's contents details a slightly different exchange:

Parks later said, "That was a tough moment for both Brian and me. I just went over to see how he was, and he wasn't good. Of course, you couldn't tell that from this song, because it represents such hope, but it came out of a very difficult time." He remembered, "It was a rare visit. In a five-day rush at that house, I came out with one song."  Asked in 1976 about his remarks from the tape, Wilson responded, "I was serious. I used to think I was insane. I'm a lot saner since I've had my doctor."

Parks said that he subsequently "put the tape away, and lay low", as he had "wanted to avoid getting involved with the internecine group dilemmas once again." As of 2006, Parks did not know the whereabouts of the tape, having given it to Warner Bros. in 1972. A four-minute edit of the tape was later released in 2022, on Sail On Sailor - 1972.

Alterations
Biographer Peter Ames Carlin stated that the song was essentially co-written by Wilson and Parks in 1971, with Kennedy and Almer's lyrical contributions dating from impromptu sessions at Three Dog Night singer Danny Hutton's house during the period. Wilson said in a 2007 interview:

Kennedy recalled that "Sail On, Sailor" had originally been intended by Wilson for Three Dog Night, and that he had written the song with Wilson over the course of three days in 1970:

Manager Jack Rieley stated that when he was informed by Warner Bros. executives of the song's existence, he took a flight from Holland to Los Angeles and, while staying at a Holiday Inn, devised new lyrics that "reflected how I felt 'lost like a sewer rat alone but I sail…' about having to fly out to LA. Van Dyke contributed additional lyrics." Kennedy later sued to be recognized as the song's co-author. According to Parks, after the lawsuit, "my name and participation diminished, and in some ensuing cases I've been given no royalties or credit at all." Wilson, Almer, and Parks are officially listed as composers, while Rieley and Kennedy are officially listed as lyricists.

Production
In October 1972, Warner rejected the Beach Boys' original version of Holland, which had contained "We Got Love" as the opening track, for lacking a potential hit single.  According to Parks, "Holland arrived at the Burbank offices and it was the consensus of everyone in A&R, promotion, and distribution, that the album was 'un-releasable'." Biographer Timothy White writes,

After discussion among Warner executives, Parks said that he had the aforementioned tape of "Sail On, Sailor", and suggested that the song could be recorded as the album's lead track.  The label then enjoined the Beach Boys to drop what the company perceived as the weakest track ("We Got Love") and replace it with the song. By Rieley's account, 

According to biographer Steven Gaines, 

The Beach Boys ultimately recorded the song at Village Recorders on November 28, 1972, with production by Carl Wilson. Brian remembered being "grossly incompetent" with the song and that he had failed to show up to the sessions. Ricky Fataar said, "I remember Carl called Brian to say 'Is this the right chord?' and 'What kind of a groove is it?' Brian was at home on the telephone telling us what to do with the song. He came up with this idea that Carl should play a part that was sort of like an SOS, Morse code signal ... 'Dd-dd-dd dd-dd-dd', and Carl went out and played that and it was just right."

The lead vocal was first attempted by Dennis Wilson, who sang the vocal once before leaving to go surfing. Carl was the next to attempt a vocal, but he then suggested that Blondie Chaplin make an attempt. After two takes, Carl decided that Chaplin's vocal would feature as the lead.

Release
"Sail On, Sailor" was released as the lead single from Holland in February 1973, backed with "Only with You", and peaked at number 79 on the Billboard Hot 100. On March 10, 1975, it was reissued (also backed with "Only with You") and charted higher, at number 49.

In the UK, "Sail On, Sailor" was issued as a single in June 1975 and failed to chart. Pet Sounds lyricist Tony Asher, despite expressing distaste for much of the band's work after ceasing his collaboration with Brian Wilson, praised the song as "just dandy".

Personnel
Credits from Craig Slowinski, John Brode, Will Crerar and Joshilyn Hoisington

The Beach Boys
Blondie Chaplin - lead and backing vocals, bass guitar
Ricky Fataar - backing vocals, drums
Mike Love - backing vocals
Carl Wilson - backing vocals, grand pianos, Wurlitzer electric piano, electric guitar, Hammond organ, ARP Odyssey synthesizers, producer

Additional musicians
Gerry Beckley - backing vocals
Kevin Michaels - tambourine

Cover versions

 1976 – KGB, KGB (Ray Kennedy on lead vocals)' 1977 – Steve Hunter, Swept Away 1980 – Ray Kennedy, Ray Kennedy 1995 – Golden Earring, Love Sweat 1996 – Shawn Colvin, Head Above Water 2002 – The Bluetones, "After Hours"
 2002 – Sting with Lulu, Together 2003 – Jimmy Buffett, Meet Me In Margaritaville: The Ultimate Collection 2021 - Los Lobos, Native Sons''

Charts

Notes

References

Bibliography

External links
 

Songs about sailors
1973 singles
The Beach Boys songs
Songs written by Brian Wilson
Songs written by Van Dyke Parks
Songs written by Tandyn Almer
Songs written by Jack Rieley
Song recordings produced by Carl Wilson
Songs written by Raymond Louis Kennedy
Reprise Records singles